Scrobipalpa jariorum is a moth in the family Gelechiidae. It was described by Peter Huemer and Ole Karsholt in 2010. It is found in Bulgaria.

Etymology
This species name is dedicated to Jari Junnilainen and Jari-Pekka Kaitila who collected important material of Gnorimoschemini.

Description
Its head is white with some brown mottling around the neck. Its labial palpi are white and each has two faint black rings. The antennae have rings of black and white. The hindwings are light grey. The forewings are white with scattered black scales.

Range
It has only been found in Bulgaria.

References

Scrobipalpa
Moths described in 2010